Korangi is one of the neighbourhoods of Korangi District, Landhi Town in Karachi, Sindh, Pakistan. Korangi District has three administrative towns.

Korangi is a town in the eastern parts of Karachi, Pakistan, north of the Malir River. It is bordered by Faisal Cantonment and Shah Faisal Town to the north, Bin Qasim Town and Landhi Town to the east and south, Korangi Creek Cantonment to the southwest and Jamshed Town to the west across the Malir River. Many hospitals are located in the area including; Indus Hospital, Chiniot Hospital, East-Side Hospital, Rahmatullah Benevolent Eye Hospital Korangi 2½, Chiniot General Hospital Korangi 2, Govt. Hospital Korangi 5, and Doctor Sultan Hospital Korangi 4.

Korangi is a town having markets at Korangi 2,4,6 and mobile market at Korangi 4. Some famous schools are Nasra School, the Educators, the Smart School, Sarfraz Pilot School, Habib Academy, Modern English School, White Rose School, and many more. Some sports ground including Nasim Hameed Sports Complex at Korangi 5 are the progressive part of Korangi. The population of Korangi Town was estimated to be about 800,000 in 2012.

History 
Korangi Township was established in 1959.

Korangi Industrial Area 
The Korangi Industrial Area (KIA) is one of the largest industrial areas in Pakistan. Getz Pharma, Indus Pharma, Martin Dow. AGI, AGM, Afroze Chemicals, Abbotte Pharma are famous industries. The Karachi Electric Supply Company’s (K-E) 220 MW Korangi Combined Cycle Power Plant is also located at Korangi Industrial Area.

Demographics 
There are several ethnic groups in Korangi including Muhajirs, Sindhis, Punjabis, Kashmiris, Seraikis, Pakhtuns, Hazara Hindko Speaking Balochis, Memons, Bengali, Gilgiti, Balti, Tamils, Hindus and Christians. The population of Korangi Town was estimated to be about 550,000 in 1998, 800,000 in 2010.  A new bridge (2009) at the Drigh Road connects Korangi with Shahrah-e-Faisal.

Korangi Creek 
On the eastern side of Karachi—between Karachi and Keti Bandar - the area extending from Korangi to Rehri Creek at the north-eastern side is known as the Korangi Creek which further extends to Phitti, Gizri, Khuddi, Khai, Pitiani, Dobbo, Sisa, Hajamro, Turshian and Khobar creeks. Korangi – Phitti is an area of about 64,000 hectares which is just over one-tenth of the tidal area of the Indus River Delta. It comprises dense mangroves and tidal creeks, mud flats and sand. The distance between Bundal to Gharo, the farthest end is about 32 miles.

See also 
 Faisal Cantonment
 Ibrahim Hyderi
 Landhi Town
 Korangi
 Korangi Town
 Korangi District
 Korangi J Area
 Korangi Industrial Area
 Korangi Creek Cantonment
 Korangi (disambiguation)
 Korangi railway station

References

External links 
 Karachi Website.

Neighbourhoods of Karachi
Landhi Town